Kharkiv Governorate was a governorate of Ukraine from 1918 to 1925.

The region was re-established in 1918 as the Kharkov Governorate plus southern regions of Kursk Governorate and Voronezh Governorate. The governorate had international borders with the Don Republic to the east and the Soviet Russia to the north. During occupation by the Volunteer Army in 1919–1920, it was transformed into the Kharkov Oblast and expanded including several governorates. According to Soviet historians, in 1920–1921, 57 anti-Bolshevik insurgent detachments operated on the territory of the governorate, the number of some of them reaching several hundreds.

After defeat of the Volunteer Army in 1920, it was returned to the borders that it had within the Russian Empire, while some eastern counties were transferred to the newly created Donetsk Governorate. In 1925 it was dissolved into four okruhas: Sumy Okruha, Kharkiv Okruha, Izyum Okruha, Bohodukhiv Okruha and Kupiansk Okruha.

List of counties
 Sumy County
 Lebedyn County
 Okhtyrka County
 Bohodukhiv County
 Valky County
 Zmiiv County
 Kharkiv County
 Vovchansk County
 Izium County
 Kupiansk County
 Starobilsk County

Added counties
 Haivoron County
 Bilhorod County
 Sudzha County
 Oboian County
 Korocha County
 Novyi Oskil County
 Biriuch County
 Valuiky County
 Ostrohozk County
 Bohuchar County (west)

References

Governorates of Ukraine